FC Tiraspol was a Moldovan football club based in Tiraspol, Moldova. They played in the Divizia Naţională, the top division in Moldovan football.

Founded in 1992 as Constructorul Chișinău, it entered the Moldovan National Division in the 1995–96 season, winning its only title in the 1996–97 and Moldovan Cups in 1996 and 2000. The club then relocated in 2001 to Cioburciu before moving to Tiraspol the year after. Despite the latter two settlements being in the breakaway republic of Transnistria, their clubs play in the Moldovan league system.

History

Constructorul Chisinau
The side was founded in 1992 as Constructorul Chisinau, and played in Chisinau, the Moldovan capital. It entered the Moldovan National Division in the 1995–96 season. Constructorul won their first silverware, the 1996 Moldovan Cup with a 2–1 win over Tiligul Tiraspol, and the next season won their only Moldovan National Division title by denying city rivals Zimbru Chișinău a sixth consecutive triumph. The league triumph earned Constructorul a place in the 1997-98 UEFA Champions League, where they were knocked out by Belarusian club MPKC Mozyr 4–3 on aggregate in the first qualifying round. In 2000, Constructorul won their second Cup, by beating Zimbru 1–0 in the final on 24 May.

The club also participated in the UEFA Cup during the Constructorul era. In September 2000, the club was banned from appearing in European competitions for a year following a number of security breaches in a home match against Bulgarian side CSKA Sofia.

The first FC Tiraspol chairman was Valeriu Rotari (1947–2000), a businessman accused of organized crime gang activities. Thanks to Rotari, the club managed to achieve his first National Division titles. The murder of Rotari on February 16, 2000 was one of the reasons the club's further performance was much worse than in the 1990s.

Move to Transnistria
Before the 2001–02 season, the club relocated to Cioburciu, a small village outside Tiraspol, the capital of the breakaway republic of Transnistria, and was renamed Constructorul Cioburciu. The following season, the club moved into Tiraspol and became its current entity. The club has not won a Cup or National Division title since leaving Chisinau.

The only major European campaign since leaving Chisinau was the 2004-05 UEFA Cup. The club defeated Armenian team Shirak in the first qualifying round (4–1 on aggregate)  before a 5–1 aggregate elimination by Metalurh Donetsk of Ukraine in the next round.

Past crests

Honours
 Divizia Naţională (1): 1996–97
 Moldovan Cup (3): 1995–96, 1999–2000, 2012–13
 Moldovan "A" Division (1): 1994–95
 Moldovan "B" Division (1): 1993–94

List of seasons
Until 2001, the club was known as Constructorul Chișinău, in 2001–02 as Constructorul Cioburciu, and FC Tiraspol since 2002.

European record

UEFA Champions League

UEFA Europa League

UEFA Intertoto Cup

UEFA Cup Winners' Cup

Managers

 Alexandru Mațiura (1996–1998)
 Ihor Nadein (1998–1999)
 Dumitru Chihaev (1999)
 Ion Caras (1999–Jun, 2000)
 Dumitru Borcău (Jul, 2000)
 Iurie Arcan (Aug, 2000–2000)
 Ilie Vieru (2000–Jan, 2001)
 Nicolae Mandricenco (Jan, 2001–Aug, 2001)
 Oleksandr Holokolosov (Aug, 2001–Oct, 2001)
 Yuriy Kulish (2001–2002)
 Ihor Nakonechnyi (2002–Jun, 2003)
 Alexandru Mațiura (2003–2004)
 Victor Barîșev (2004)
 Yuriy Kulish (Dec 21, 2004–Aug, 2006)
 Volodymyr Reva (Aug, 2006 – Dec 1, 2008)
 Emil Caras (Dec 1, 2008 – June 30, 2009)
 Sergey Yasinsky (July 1, 2009 – Dec 31, 2009)
 Iurie Blonari (Jan 1, 2010 – Dec 31, 2010)
 Vlad Goian (Jan 1, 2011–Dec, 2014)
 Lilian Popescu (Dec 15, 2014–2015)

References

External links
 Official website 
 Profile at DiviziaNationala.com 

 
Tiraspol, FC
Tiraspol, FC
Tiraspol, FC
1992 establishments in Moldova
Tiraspol
Tiraspol, FC
Tiraspol, FC